Southern Methodist University (SMU) is a private research university in University Park, Texas, with a satellite campus in Taos County, New Mexico. SMU was founded on April 17, 1911, by the Methodist Episcopal Church, South—now part of the United Methodist Church—in partnership with Dallas civic leaders. However, it is nonsectarian in its teaching and enrolls students of all religious affiliations. It is classified among "R-2: Doctoral Universities – High Research Activity".

As of fall 2020, the university had 12,373 students, including 6,827 undergraduates and 5,546 postgraduates, representing the largest student body in SMU history. As of fall 2019, its instructional faculty is 1,151, with 754 being full-time.

In the 2020 academic year, the university granted over 3,827 degrees, including 315 doctorates, 1,659 master's and 1,853 bachelor's degrees and offers over 32 doctoral and over 120 masters programs from eight schools: the Edwin L. Cox School of Business, the Dedman College of Humanities and Sciences, the Dedman School of Law, the Bobby B. Lyle School of Engineering, the Algur H. Meadows School of the Arts, the Moody School of Graduate and Advanced Studies, Perkins School of Theology, and the Annette Caldwell Simmons School of Education and Human Development.

History 
The university was chartered on April 17, 1911, by the southern denomination of the Methodist Episcopal Church. At the time of the charter, church leaders saw a need to establish a Methodist institution within a metropolitan area. Originally, this new institution was intended to be created in Fort Worth through a merger between Polytechnic College (now Texas Wesleyan University) and Southwestern University. However, the church's education commission instead opted to create a new institution in Dallas to serve this purpose after extensive lobbying by the Dallas Chamber of Commerce. Robert Stewart Hyer, previously president of Southwestern University, was appointed as the first president of the new university.

The effort to establish a new university in Dallas drew the attention of the General Conference of the Methodist Church, which was seeking to create a new connectional institution in the wake of a 1914 Tennessee Supreme Court decision stripping the church of authority at Vanderbilt University. The church decided to support the establishment of the new institution while also increasing the size of Emory University at a new location in DeKalb County, Georgia. At the 1914 meeting of the General Conference, Southern Methodist University was designated the connectional institution for all conferences west of the Mississippi River.

SMU named its first building Dallas Hall in gratitude for the support of Dallas leaders and local citizens, who had pledged $300,000 to secure the university's location. It remains the university's symbol and centerpiece, and it inspired "the Hilltop" as a nickname for the school. It was designed by Shepley, Rutan and Coolidge after the Rotunda at the University of Virginia. Dallas Hall opened its doors in 1915 and housed the entire university along with a bank and a barbershop. The hall is registered in the National Register of Historic Places.

Classes were planned to officially begin in 1913, but construction delays on the university's first building prevented classes from starting until 1915. In the interim, the only functioning academic department at SMU was the medical college it had acquired from Southwestern University.

As the first president of Southern Methodist University, Hyer selected Harvard crimson and Yale blue as the school colors in order to associate SMU with the high standards of Ivy League universities. Several streets in University Park and adjacent Highland Park were named after prominent universities.

In 1927, Highland Park United Methodist Church, designed by architects Mark Lemmon and Roscoe DeWitt, was erected on campus.

During World War II, SMU was one of 131 colleges and universities nationally that took part in the V-12 Navy College Training Program which offered students a path to a Navy commission.

In 1987, the university football program's repeated, flagrant recruiting violations led to the NCAA administering the death penalty against the program. The punishment included cancellation of the 1987 football season, most of the 1988 season, and a two-year ban from Bowl Games and televised sports coverage.

On February 22, 2008, the university trustees unanimously instructed President R. Gerald Turner to enter into an agreement to establish the George W. Bush Presidential Center on 23 acres on the southeast side of the campus. The center, which includes a presidential library, museum, institute, and the offices of the George W. Bush Foundation, was dedicated on April 25, 2013, in a ceremony which featured all living former U.S. Presidents Jimmy Carter, George H. W. Bush, Bill Clinton, George W. Bush, and then-incumbent U.S. president, Barack Obama.

The library and museum are privately administered by the National Archives and Records Administration, while the university holds representation on the independent public policy institute board. The project raised over $500 million for the construction and endowment of the George W. Bush presidential center, which has a 249-year ground lease from SMU, with extensions, and operates completely separate from SMU.

The university's endowment surpassed $1 billion for the first time in the university's history in 2005. Through its "Second Century Campaign" from 2008 to 2015, the university raised $1.15 billion and celebrated the centennials of its 1911 founding and 1915 opening through the renovation of Fondren Library, the construction of five new residential halls, and other campus revitalization projects.

Split from the United Methodist Church
In light of the turmoil within the Methodist Church over what it described as "fundamental differences" over LGBTQ policies, the university decided to separate itself from control of the church.

In November 2019, the SMU board filed with the state of Texas amended articles of incorporation that eliminated the United Methodist Church's rights as listed in the 1996 articles. The amendment made it clear that SMU is solely maintained and controlled by its Board as the ultimate authority for the university and removed an overarching statement that the school would be "owned, maintained and controlled by the South Central Jurisdictional Conference." Within a month, the Church filed a lawsuit alleging that the trustees of SMU have no authority to amend the Articles of Incorporation without the prior approval and authorization of SCJC. In March 2021, Dallas County judge ruled in favor of Southern Methodist University in the lawsuit.

Historical Plano campus 
Southern Methodist University operated a small campus, consisting of 16 acres and 4 buildings, in Plano, Texas, in Legacy Business Park. This campus hosted SMU's video game design school, SMU Guildhall, and other graduate-level programs. After the university sold the Plano campus to a developer in 2019, SMU Guildhall and all other programs housed there moved onto the main Dallas campus in the new Gerald J. Ford Hall for Research and Innovation on December 4, 2020.

Organization and resources

Institutional organization 

SMU has eight degree-granting schools each headed by a dean, with all undergraduates entering the university in the Dedman College of Humanities and Sciences as pre-majors:
 Cox School of Business
 Dedman College of Humanities and Sciences
 Dedman School of Law
 Lyle School of Engineering
 Meadows School of the Arts
 Moody School of Graduate and Advanced Studies 
 Perkins School of Theology
 Simmons School of Education and Human Development

Endowment and financial resources 

Southern Methodist University's endowment of $1.664 billion ranks 67th largest among the endowments of colleges and universities in the United States and Canada,  and is one of only 110 with an endowment greater than $1 billion as of June 30, 2019.

On February 26, 2016, SMU announced that "The Centennial Campaign" which concluded on December 31, 2015, had raised $1.15 billion, the largest fundraising campaign of any institution in North Texas's history, the largest total for a private Texas university, and the fourth largest of any university in Texas. The Centennial Campaign, coinciding with the 100-year anniversary of the university's founding in 1911 and opening in 1915 also made SMU one of only 34 private colleges and universities in the United States to complete a campaign of $1 billion or more.

Its previous fundraising campaign, "A Time to Lead", which concluded in April 2002 and raised $542 million was the largest fundraising campaign in the school's history at the time. Under R. Gerald Turner's leadership and through two successive campaigns in under 20 years, SMU has received well over $1.6 billion in commitments in support of institutional priorities.

By 1986 as the university neared the 75th anniversary of its founding, SMU's endowment had grown from $60 million a decade earlier in 1976 to nearly $325 million, at the time the 27th largest in the country. the previous "The Design for the Third Generation" fundraising campaign, which had been concluded in May 1983 raised nearly $120 million in gifts and pledges.

Campuses

Main campus 

The main campus of Southern Methodist University is located in Dallas, Texas. It is located on 234 acres of land just west of US Route 75. Dallas Hall is the centerpiece for this campus and is the administrative center for the Dedman College of Humanities and Sciences.

Most of the campus is centered around Bishop Boulevard, an elongated, tree-lined loop road that also serves as the site for "Boulevarding," SMU's version of the tailgating seen on many American college campuses. The campus was ranked as the most beautiful campus in America by Condé Nast Traveler in 2016 and also hosts the George W. Bush Presidential Center, located on the east side of the campus. The library and museum are privately administered by the National Archives and Records Administration, while the university holds representation on the institute board.

Taos campus 
Since 1973, the university has owned a 423-acre campus located at Fort Burgwin, just outside of Taos, New Mexico. This campus hosts classes during intersessions between semesters and during the summer. Along with the normal academic courses offered at the site, students attending classes at this campus during the winter can opt to attend wellness classes centered around winter sports. Other courses offered at this campus are sometimes adjusted to utilize the surrounding environment, such as a course in field botany offered during some summers.

Academics

Admissions 
For the class of 2024 (entering Fall 2020), 14,010 students applied, 7,379 (52.7%) were admitted, and 1,531 enrolled/matriculated (20.7%) – including 758 women and 773 men, and the 1 year retention rate (entering Fall 2019) was 92%. The average SAT was 1,343 while the average ACT was 30.6. The middle 50% SAT range for enrolled students was 630–710 for Evidence-Based Reading & Writing, 620–740 for math, while the ACT Composite range was 29–33.

University Honors Program 
First-year undergraduate students admitted to SMU are automatically reviewed for admissions into the highly selective University Honors Program (UHP). Generally, first-year students that rank in the top 10% of their incoming class will receive a formal invitation to join the UHP. Students that do not receive an invitation must have completed at least one full-time semester on campus with a cumulative GPA of 3.5 or higher before formally applying for admissions. The University Honors Program is a liberal arts honors experience that serves to supplement the basic SMU University Curriculum. Students are required to take honors courses throughout their time at SMU, and the program culminates with a final senior project or experience. Each student's experience can be unique, and students are encouraged to pursue projects in their area of study or about their passions.

Reputation and rankings 

In the 2021 edition, U.S. News & World Report SMU is tied for 66th in the rankings of national universities, with its highest ranking by the U.S. News & World Report being 56th in 2017, and 2011.

In spring 2020, U.S. News & World Report ranked the Cox School's Executive M.B.A. program No. 27 in the nation.

U.S. News & World Report ranks the Dedman School of Law tied for 56th in the U.S. for 2021. and it ranks No. 23 among the top 50 law schools with the highest average salaries of first-year graduates, according to data released by the U.S. Department of Education in April 2020 based on 2016 salaries.

In 2020, Condé Nast Traveler ranked SMU among "The 50 Most Beautiful College Campuses in America", naming it the No.6 most beautiful college campuses in America in 2016.

In 2020 The Princeton Review in its 11th edition ranked SMU Guildhall as the No. 4 "Graduate Program for Game Design" in the world. Since the rankings debuted in 2010, the SMU Guildhall has ranked in the top 10, earning N0. 7 in 2013, No. 3 in 2014 and 2015, No. 2 in 2016 and 2019, and the No. 1 spot in 2017, and 2018 for two years in a row in a survey of over 150 institutions. The Princeton Review also ranks SMU as one of the "Best Western Colleges" and as eighth in "Lots of Greek Life."

In the 2019 edition, SMU is ranked 91st in by Forbes.

In 2016, Bloomberg Businessweek ranked the Cox School B.B.A. program No. 21 in the nation — the second consecutive ranking at No. 21 in that publication, and No. 5 in the nation for post-graduation B.B.A. salaries. The 2016 Bloomberg Businessweek undergraduate rankings survey, which the publication announced it will no longer conduct after this year, ranked 114 U.S. schools based heavily on career outcomes. Bloomberg Businessweek also ranked the SMU Cox Professional MBA program No. 7 in the nation; the SMU Cox Full-Time MBA program No. 31 in the nation; and ranked the SMU Cox Executive MBA program no. 3 in the world in 2013, the last year the publication ranked EMBA programs.

In 2015, Forbes named Southern Methodist University as the No.14th among America's Most Entrepreneurial Universities.

In 2014, USA Today ranked SMU as the number 1 music college in the United States.

Research centers, institutes and related facilities
 AT&T Center for Virtualization – is housed within the SMU Lyle School of Engineering. 
 Bridwell Institute for Economic Freedom
 Cary M. Maguire Center for Ethics and Public Responsibility
 The Brierley Institute for Customer Engagement – at SMU Cox
 Darwin Deason Institute for Cyber Security – housed within the SMU Lyle School of Engineering. 
 Southwestern Graduate School of Banking – based within the SMU Cox School of Business. 
 John Goodwin Tower Center for Public Policy and International Affairs – Named after John Tower (MA 1953), former United States Senator for Texas from 1961 to 1985.
 SMU Guildhall – The university also awards the Master of Interactive Technology (MIT) in Digital Game Development, as well as the Professional Certificate in Digital Game Development, with specializations in Art, Design, Production, and Programming – the only graduate program in the country to offer all four pillars of game development and has been ranked as the #1 Graduate Program for Game Design in the world by the Princeton Review for two years in a row.
 SMU DataArts: National Center for Arts Research (NCAR) – based within the SMU Cox School of Business. 
 Southwestern Graduate School of Banking – based within the SMU Cox School of Business. 
 William P. Clements Center for Southwest Studies

Libraries and museums

Libraries 

 Business Information Center (BIC) – Business school library. Some resources are available to the public.
 Bridwell Library – Named for the philanthropist Joseph Sterling Bridwell of Wichita Falls, the Bridwell Library (established 1950) is one of the leading theological research collections in the United States.
 Central University Libraries – Central University Libraries is the largest of the SMU library administrative units, with holdings of more than 2.1 million volumes. It comprises the Fondren Library Center, the Jake and Nancy Hamon Arts Library, the DeGolyer Library of Special Collections, the SMU Archives, the ISEM Reading Room (Institute for the Study of Earth and Man), the Norwick Center for Digital Services, and the Fred Wendorf Information Center at SMU-in-Taos, New Mexico.
 CUL Digital Collections – Central University Libraries Digital Collections provide anyone around the world the ability to access a variety of text, videos and images. These collections are part of CUL's ongoing effort to digitize and make available SMU's unique special collections on the Web.
 DeGolyer Library – The DeGolyer Library is the principal repository at SMU for special collections in the humanities, the history of business, and the history of science and technology. Dedicated to enhancing scholarship and teaching at SMU, the DeGolyer Library is charged with maintaining and building its various collections "for study, research, and pleasure." Established in 1957 by gifts from geophysicist Everette Lee DeGolyer, DeGolyer Library houses one of the strongest collections in the United States on the Trans-Mississippi West, Texas, the Spanish borderlands, transportation with an emphasis on railroads, and business history.
 Fondren Library Center – The largest collection of resources on campus, Fondren Library houses materials in the humanities, social sciences and business, as well as government information resources. Fondren Library also houses the Science and Engineering Library which includes collections in biology, chemistry, physics, earth sciences, mathematics, statistics, computer science, and civil, mechanical, and electrical engineering. The library has particularly strong collections in the earth sciences, electronics, general science and technology. The Norwick Center for Digital Collections is also housed in Fondren. Fondren Library is open 24 hours, and is a common study place for students. Students have been known to call Fondren Library Center "Club Fondy" due to the social nature of the library. Fondren Library is also home to a Starbucks Cafe that serves faculty, staff, and students.
 Edwin J Foscue Map Library – Located in Fondren Library Center, this is one of the largest map collections in the Southwest.
 Fort Burgwin Library – The Fort Burgwin Library, located on the SMU-in-Taos campus in New Mexico, contains approximately 9,768 books and small collections of journals and maps.
 Hamon Arts Library – Hamon Arts Library supports the undergraduate and graduate programs of the Meadows School of the Arts in the disciplines of art, arts administration, cinema, dance, music, and theater. The Library's circulating and reference collections contain more than 180,000 items relating to the visual and performing arts. In addition, the Library has some 300 subscriptions to arts periodicals and provides access to more than 40 online resources that are specific to the arts.
 Norwick Center for Digital Services – The Center includes a student multimedia center and screening room and supports a full range of digital services, production services and collaborative technology support, including the CUL Digital Collections.
 Underwood Law Library – The Underwood Law Library's more than 640,000 volumes support the instruction and research of the Dedman School of Law and the general SMU community. The Library's collection is particularly strong in the areas of international law, commercial law, securities, taxation, jurisprudence, oil and gas, and air and space law.

Publications

Field & Laboratory was a scientific journal published semiannually, then quarterly, sponsored by the science departments of the university. It was established November 1, 1932, and had a total of 27 volumes. With volume 17 in 1949, quarterly publication commenced. The final issue was published in October 1959. Articles are available in PDF format at SMU Scholar, a partnership between SMU Libraries, the Office of Research and Graduate Studies, and the Office of Information Technology.

Museums 
 George W. Bush Presidential Center – Located on 23 acres on the east side of the SMU main campus, the center includes a presidential library, museum, institute, and the offices of the George W. Bush Foundation. The library and museum are privately administered by the National Archives and Records Administration, while the university holds representation on the independent public policy institute board. the center serves as a resource for the study of the George W. Bush presidency and includes a full-size replica of the White House Oval Office, as it was during his presidency, together with over 43,000 artifacts, almost 70 million pages of textual materials, over 3.8 million photographs, 80 terabytes of electronic records, and overt 200 million email messages.

 Meadows Museum – The Meadows Museum's collection was assembled by its founder, Algur H. Meadows. It houses several collections including a collection of Spanish art from the tenth to the 21st centuries. The museum holds different exhibits for periods of time every year. In 2018 it held the exhibition "Dali: Poetics of the Small, 1929–1936", followed by Mariano Fortuny y Masal's artwork in the "Fortuny: Friends and Followers" exhibit. This exhibit will run from February 19 to June 6. It also includes a sculpture collection including works by David Smith, Henry Moore and Claes Oldenburg, as well as by contemporary sculptors such as James Surls. Important figural sculptures by Rodin, Maillol, and Giacometti are also housed within the museum. It is also responsible for the university's art collection, including work by several important regional artists. 
 Pollock Gallery – The Pollock Gallery provides an ever-changing display of works by the faculty and students of the Meadows School of the Arts, as well as by outside artists. It is located in the Hughes–Trigg Student Center.

Student life

Student demographics 

 As of the Fall 2020 semester, the university's 12,373 students are 6,827 undergraduates and 5,546 postgraduates from all 50 states and 83 countries. The leading 10 states of origin of U.S. residents in descending order of the total undergraduate population are Texas (2,932), California (858), Florida (264), Illinois (194), Georgia (155), New York (155), Connecticut (149), Missouri (131), Tennessee (114), Arizona (98), Colorado (91), Louisiana (91), New Jersey (91), and Arkansas (84).
 As of the Fall 2020 semester, the university's international student population of 1,117 (9%) comes from 83 countries and includes 392 undergraduate and 725 graduate students. The leading 10 countries of origin in descending order for undergraduates are China (204), Mexico (26), Canada (12), Vietnam (10), Korea (9), United Kingdom (8), Brazil (8), Australia (6), India (6), Panama (5), Spain (5), Côte d'Ivoire (4), France (4), Germany (4), Honduras (4), Taiwan (4), United Arab Emirates (4), Venezuela (4), El Salvador (3), Nigeria (3), Peru (3), and Saudi Arabia (3). In descending order for Graduate students, the countries are China (288), India (115), Saudi Arabia (49), Mexico (39), Iran (25), Korea (19), Taiwan (18), Canada (14), Italy (9) and South Africa (8) 
 As of the Fall 2020 semester, 31.4% of the student body are members of a minority group, while females constitute 49% of the undergraduate and 48% of the graduate student populations, respectively.
 As of the Fall 2020 semester, SMU's female to male ratio is approximately 1:1 and its student-faculty ratio is 11:1. The average age of undergraduate students is 20, while that of graduate and professional students is 30, and the total average student age is 25.
 Among students reporting a religious affiliation, 25% are Catholic, 13% are Methodist, 38% are from other Protestant denominations, and 15% are from other religions including Judaism and Hinduism.

Undergraduate housing 

Since the autumn of 2014, Southern Methodist University's undergraduate housing system has operated on a residential commons model rooted in similar systems at Oxford and Cambridge Universities in England. Undergraduate students are required to live on campus for their first two years, and they must live their first year in one of the eleven residential commons that they are randomly sorted into after enrollment. Each commons houses a faculty-in-residence and a residential community director that organize events and interact with the residents. The eleven residential commons are Armstrong, Boaz, Cockrell-McIntosh, Crum, Kathy Crow, Loyd, Mary Hay-Peyton-Shuttles, McElvaney, Morrison-McGinnis, Virginia-Snider, and Ware. Built in 1926, Virginia-Snider Commons is the oldest of the current residence halls. It served as a women's dormitory in the university's early years, and it later served as the common residence hall for students in the University Honors Program before the implementation of the residential commons model. The youngest commons are those that opened in 2014: Armstrong, Kathy Crow, Ware, Loyd, and Crum.

After their first year, students have the option of moving into other on-campus housing facilities such as Greek Life houses, SMU Service House, and apartment-style upperclassman housing, such as Moore Hall and Daniel Two. A new SMU-owned apartment building has also been added in 2020 across from Daniel Two on Daniel Avenue. After two years, students are able to live off campus if they would like.

SMU has also temporarily allowed fully virtual students in the first two years to live off-campus during the 2020 school year because of COVID-19. This is to protect any student who wants to be close to campus, yet fears the risks of living in a large dorm.

Student organizations 
Southern Methodist University is home to almost three hundred student organizations, including academic, professional, fraternal, sporting, ethnic themed, religious, service, and political diversity groups. Notable examples include the Feminist Equality Movement (FEM), the service organization Mustang Heroes, one of the largest organizations on campus, and the Embrey Human Rights Program.
Student organizations such as Student Foundation and Program Council frequently sponsor all-student events on various weekdays and weekends as well as boulevard tents. Student Foundation helps put on popular events such as Family Weekend, the Tate lectures, Celebration of Lights, Homecoming, and Perunapalooza.

Student media 
The Daily Campus was the independent student newspaper between 1915 and 2018. The frequency of the publication changed throughout the years and with the change in semesters. Publishing less frequently over the summer, for example. The board of directors of The Student Media Company, the independent nonprofit that at one time oversaw all student media, including KSMU and Rotunda, voted to dissolve due to a lack of funds in April 2018. Although still publishing in digital format, the newspaper lost its independent status in May 2018.

Other student media include:
 The Rotunda, the official SMU yearbook
 SMU-TV, a student-run television station serving the Park Cities community
 The Daily Update, a weekday morning newscast that airs on SMU-TV and smudailymustang.com
 Hilltopics, a publication sponsored by the University Honors Program that publishes periodically
 The Muddler, a satirical newspaper
 SMU LOOK, a student-run fashion magazine, website, Instagram, TikTok, and YouTube channel
 SMU Style, a student-run fashion and lifestyle blog
As of May 2018, The Daily Campus was placed under the control of the school's journalism department.

KSMU, a student-radio station, operated from 1964 to 1989. It broadcast as a carrier-current and FM station; in the 1980s, it was restricted to broadcasting within the student center and via local cable. The call letters were changed to KPNI, which operated from 1995 to 2011. In the latter days, it was a digital streaming station and moved from management under the auspices of The Student Media Co. to the department of journalism. The university radio station shuttered in 2011 due to a lack of funding.

Greek life 
Southern Methodist University has approximately 43% of the undergraduate student body affiliated with its Greek system.
 8 North American Interfraternity Conference (Beta Upsilon Chi, Sigma Alpha Epsilon, Kappa Sigma, Phi Delta Theta, Beta Theta Pi, Phi Gamma Delta, Sigma Chi, Sigma Nu, and Alpha Epsilon Pi)
 8 National Panhellenic Conference sororities (Alpha Chi Omega, Chi Omega, Delta Gamma, Delta Delta Delta, Gamma Phi Beta, Kappa Kappa Gamma, and Pi Beta Phi)
 7 National Pan-Hellenic Council (NPHC) organizations (Alpha Phi Alpha, Kappa Alpha Psi, Omega Psi Phi, and Phi Beta Sigma fraternities and Alpha Kappa Alpha, Delta Sigma Theta, and Zeta Phi Beta sororities)
 5 National Multicultural Greek Council (NMGC) organizations (Sigma Phi Omega sorority, Sigma Lambda Gamma sorority, Kappa Delta Chi sorority, Omega Delta Phi fraternity, and Sigma Lambda Beta fraternity)
 3 Professional Fraternity Association fraternities (Delta Sigma Pi, Alpha Kappa Psi, and Theta Tau)
 One Christian fraternity (Beta Upsilon Chi) and one Christian sorority (Sigma Phi Lambda)
One Jewish fraternity (Alpha Epsilon Pi)
 One service fraternity (Alpha Phi Omega)

SMU delays Greek recruitment until the spring semester, giving prospective members the ability to decide over the course of the fall which organization they would like to join. This allows the prospective members the ability to meet members of the actual fraternities and have a feel of how each of them works and if they would like to try and join.

There are restrictions in the type of communication affiliated sorority members can have with potential new members throughout the fall semester set in place by the SMU Panhellenic Council. Fraternities place no such communication restrictions on the ability for the men to rush potential members. Formal recruitment occurs in mid-January after the university's winter break. The Panhellenic recruitment process takes place over four days where potential new members visit each house and on the last day they may receive a bid to join a house. After accepting a bid, new members are initiated into their chapter during the course of the spring semester.

Starting in 2010, the NPC sororities began updating and rebuilding their older sorority houses. The first house rebuilt was Pi Beta Phi, followed by Kappa Kappa Gamma, Delta Delta Delta, Chi Omega, and Kappa Alpha Theta Alpha Chi Omega began renovations in August 2019 and are expected to be complete by Spring 2021.

As of February 15, 2018, Phi Gamma Delta has been ordered to cease all organizational activity pending a university investigation into hazing. Pi Kappa Alpha received a similar notice on February 9, 2018. On March 26, 2018, Pi Kappa Alpha was officially suspended by the university until the fall of 2022. This was the second suspension of a Greek Life organization in the 2017–2018 academic year after Kappa Alpha Order was suspended in October 2017. Historical sororities that existed on the SMU campus before being removed or leaving of their own accord include the inactive chapter of Zeta Tau Alpha (whose house still remains on campus unoccupied), Alpha Delta Pi (whose house is used as Panhellenic housing for members of any sorority), and Phi Mu, whose house was eventually converted to the Alpha Chi Omega house upon their arrival to campus.

Sports

Southern Methodist University's athletics teams are known as the Mustangs and participate in the NCAA's Division I, with the football team competing as a member of Division I FBS.  The football team plays at Gerald J. Ford Stadium on the SMU campus. Mustangs compete in the American Athletic Conference (previously named Big East Conference) for all sports beginning in the 2013–14 season. Prior to that, the Mustangs participated in the now-defunct Southwest Conference and the Western Athletic Conference.

SMU's closest rival in athletics is Texas Christian University (TCU) in Fort Worth, Texas. In football, SMU and TCU compete annually (with the exception of 2006) for the Iron Skillet. In 2005, a nationally unranked SMU beat then 24th-ranked TCU for SMU's first win against a ranked team in 19 years (since October 1986). SMU also competes annually with Rice University in football for the "Mayor's Cup," a traveling trophy that has been created to enhance the Rice-SMU rivalry, which dates back to 1916. SMU has won seven more games (48-41-1) than Rice in their rivalry.

From 1980 to 1985, SMU had one of the strongest programs in Division I-A (now FBS). They posted a record of 55–14–1, and finished these seasons ranked No. 21, No. 7, No. 2, No. 19, and No. 8 in the nation. These "winningest" years concluded with the Death Penalty on February 25, 1987, due to repeated violations conducted by boosters. The NCAA administered the "death penalty" for repeated, flagrant recruiting violations. Components included cancellation of the entire 1987 season, a two-year ban from bowl appearances, a two-year ban from television appearances, a limit of seven games, all on road, in the 1988 season, a loss of three assistant coaching positions for two years and a loss of 55 new scholarships over four years. Players were allowed to transfer without sitting out one season, per standard requirement. SMU responded to the combination of these conditions by canceling the 1988 season outright.

The Doak Walker Award is an annual collegiate award given to the nation's "most outstanding college running back" for his accomplishments on the field, achievement in the classroom and citizenship in the community. It was established in 1989 and is named after SMU Heisman Trophy winner Doak Walker.

June Jones was named the head football coach at SMU in 2008. He brought a record of 76–41, all at the University of Hawaii, where he won more games than any other coach in school history. Jones stepped down in 2014 as Head Coach after a 0–2 start to the 2014 season, in which the team was outscored 88–6. He was succeeded by former Clemson assistant Chad Morris.  Chad Morris led SMU to the Frisco Bowl in 2017 in his third season before departing for the University Of Arkansas. Current head coaches of the men's football and basketball programs are Rhett Lashlee and Tim Jankovich, having started in 2021 and 2016 respectively.

The SMU football program has produced many professional football standouts, such as Don Meredith, Doak Walker, Kyle Rote, Eric Dickerson, Jerry Ball, and Craig James. As of May 2021 Nineteen Mustangs are currently active in the National Football League. Notable inclusions include wide receiver Emmanuel Sanders (Buffalo Bills), wide receiver Cole Beasley (Buffalo Bills), tackle Kelvin Beachum (Pittsburgh Steelers), wide receiver Courtland Sutton (Denver Broncos), and wide receiver Trey Quinn (Washington Football Team).

Marching Band 

SMU's marching band plays at football and basketball games, performing big band and jazz music. The approximately 80-member ensemble is nicknamed "The Best Dressed Band in the Land" due to its variety of uniform combinations. In 2001, the band performed at the first inauguration of George W. Bush.

Notable people

Notes

References

Further reading
 The book A Payroll to Meet: A Story of Greed, Corruption, and Football at SMU is a literature account of the recruiting scandals and violations that ultimately led to the famous "Death Penalty" being instituted.

External links 

 
 SMU Athletics website

 
Education in Collin County, Texas
Education in Taos County, New Mexico
Methodism in Texas
Universities and colleges accredited by the Southern Association of Colleges and Schools
Universities and colleges affiliated with the United Methodist Church
Universities and colleges in Dallas County, Texas
Universities and colleges in the Dallas–Fort Worth metroplex
Methodist Episcopal Church, South
1911 establishments in Texas
Educational institutions established in 1911
Private universities and colleges in Texas